Lycée Français Marie Curie de Zurich (LFZ)) is a French international school located in the municipality of Dübendorf (canton of Zurich) and welcomes more than 1,145 students from reception to year 13.

Accreditation

By Swiss authorities

LFZ's Kindergarten and primary education program (Primary School) as well as its lower secondary education program (Collège on the Sekundarstufe level) are approved by the bureau for elementary school (Volksschulamt), administration for education (Bildungsdirektion), canton of Zurich.

However, admission to Swiss universities with the new 2021 Baccalaureat is subject to certain restrictions.

By French authorities
The Lycée Français Marie Curie de Zurich (LFZ) is one of 535 registered establishments, which form the network of French schools abroad. As such, it is approved by the French Minister of Education. This guarantees compliance with the French curriculum as well as the recognition of the choice of study pathways and the exams taken by the pupils. On the other hand, it depends upon the French Minister of Foreign Affairs and more specifically on the Agency for French Teaching Abroad (AEFE), in Paris.

The Lycée Français Marie Curie de Zurich (LFZ) offers education from kindergarten (< 3 y.o.) to the baccalaureate exams, the official diploma accredited by the French minister of National Education. It is recognised for accessing institutes of higher education in France and in Europe as well as gaining a university education in Switzerland, on the basis of a successful French Baccalaureat, but not on the basis of a Swiss Matura.

A new baccalauréat was introduced for the 2018-19 academic year. The new bac général includes six obligatory core subjects: French, two foreign languages, sport, history-geography and a new subject called humanités scientifiques and numériques. In the second year of lycée, students can choose three speciality subjects from a wide-ranging list. In the third year, they continue with two speciality subjects.  

The 2021 baccalaureate is partly based on continuous assessment and partly on final examinations. As before, students will take the French exam (written and oral) at the end of the second year. They will then sit the exam for each of the two speciality subjects immediately after the spring school holiday in the final year. Finally the philosophy and oral exam (le grand oral) will take place at the end of the third school year. The 20-minute oral exam is based on a project studied in the final two years.

History
The Lycée Français Marie Curie de Zurich (LFZ) is an establishment in Switzerland that forms part of the Agency for French Education Abroad (AEFE). Now more than sixty-five years old, it is experiencing a growth in appeal, currently schooling more than 1,100 students.

Founded on 5 June 1955 by a group of parents, the French school taught its first class on the premises of the Catholic Mission on Hottingerstrasse. Jeanne Obrecht, a qualified French teacher, taught 14 pupils aged between 5 and 10 (and of four different nationalities). The group of parent volunteers applied to the cantonal and municipal school authorities to obtain the necessary permits. The Association de l'école française was founded on 12 January 1956 and raised most of its funds through donations. At the beginning of the second school year in October 1956, the school welcomed 26 primary school pupils, 7 secondary school students and a new teacher: Mrs Andrée Frey. However, the education authority of the Canton of Zurich decided to exclude Swiss children from the French school. In June, the parents' association lodged an appeal against this decision. After a year of negotiations, the school was authorised to accept Swiss pupils under certain conditions and was finally recognised as a private school. 

The number of students increased and the board of governors decided to buy a private house in 1959 on Rütistrasse. The French School moved into this villa in 1960. The building was gradually transformed into a modern school (addition of a gymnasium, larger classrooms, etc.) and was officially inaugurated on 30 April 1960.  In 1976, the opening of secondary school classes increased the number of students to about 200, forcing the school to rent a neighbouring house to accommodate several classes. The governors therefore considered moving. 

The number of pupils continued to grow and in 1978 the governors, a group of parents and the headmaster, Joseph Goldschmidt, chose Gockhausen, a village near Zurich,  for a new building with a capacity of 275 pupils.  

In 1980 it moved into "im Tobelacker 22" in the village of Gockhausen, near the centre of Zurich.

In 1989, France authorised the French school to take the name "Lycée Français de Zurich" (LFZ).

In 1990, the AEFE was created, its mission being to unite and support all French lycées abroad in order to ensure a good education for students and to strengthen the links between the French and foreign education systems.

In 1995, the French baccalaureate finally opened the doors to Swiss universities for lycée students provided they had an average of more than 12 out of 20. 

The number of pupils at the French lycée continued to rise and it was not until November 2001 that the general assembly of parents approved by a large majority the project to build a new building on Ursprungstrasse 10, in Gockhausen.  

The number of students doubled between 2003 and 2010 and the students were spread over four locations: the kindergarten moved to Stettbach (in 2007), the primary school remained in Tobelacker, the Ursprung building was reserved for the lower secondary, and the upper secondary occupied rented space in the SAWI building (in 2011).    

At the start of the 2011 school year, the number of pupils at the LFZ increased to over 700. The school developed its German language programme and set up an equally taught French-German bilingual programme in the infant school section officially recognised by the Education Department of the Canton of Zurich.

In November 2012 at a general assembly, the parents' association approved the decision to construct a building with a capacity of 1,100 pupils.

In September 2014 the foundation stone for the new building was laid in Dübendorf. Two years later, the LFZ officially moved and opened its doors in September 2016.

In 2017, the LFZ was awarded the prestigious title of "Swiss Building of the Year "  and passed the 1000-pupil mark.

 
In 2020, the new building reached its capacity. To remedy this problem, an annex with four rooms was rented a few minutes away from the school. 

In 2021 the school became an examination centre for the new baccalauréat and the diplôme national du brevet. 

Today, the Lycée Français de Zurich is a modern school, which evolves with the times. Indeed, many steps have been taken to be more ecologically sustainable and always at the cutting edge of technology.

Headmasters (Proviseurs) 
 Goldschmidt  Joseph (1977 à 1980)
 Marandet Yves (1980 à 1983)
 Portzer Jean Paul (1983 à 1989)
 Leleu René (1989 à 1995)
 Portela Nelly (1995-1996)
 Magère Christine (1997-1999)
 Lebourgeois Claudine (2000-2005)
 Drussel Jean-Luc (2006-2011)
 Renn Brigitte (2011-2015)
 Savall Paul (2015-2020)
 Strupler Laurent (2020-2022)
 Duvauchelle Quentin (from September 2022)

Enrolment trends

Languages at the LFZ 
 Bilingual French-German curriculum or classic French curriculum in primary schools 
 English taught from CE2 
 Optional teaching of Spanish from the 6th grade 
 Optional teaching of Latin from the 6th grade

The bilingual pathway introduced in September 2011 leads infant and primary schools pupils to a mastery of both languages at the end of their schooling through a natural acquisition of French and German. Non-language subjects are taught in equal measure in the primary school: each subject is taught in French and German to ensure joint development of skills and a balanced timetable between the two languages. This bilingual curriculum at the LFZ is recognised and authorised by the Education Authority (Bildungsdirektion). It is also compatible with the curriculum of the Canton of Zurich and French National Education. 

The school belongs to the PASCH network and is a DSD-Schule, i.e. an examination centre for the German DSD certification. It is also an examination centre for the English language certification IELTS and the Spanish language certifications DELE (Diploma de Español como Lengua Extranjera) and SIELE (Servicio Internacional de Evaluación de la Lengua Española).

Digital education at the LFZ 

In response to the law on orientation and programming for the refounding of the Republic’s schools (Loi d'Orientation et de Programmation pour la Refondation de l'Ecole de la République), which demands schools enter the digital age, the Lycée (Français de Zurich) equipped each student with a tablet in April 2016 in two pilot classes: one class in CM2 (elementary) and another in Spanish 27 (secondary).  The school's educational management team appointed François Latouche, head teacher of the primary school, as project manager. This significant investment was put to the board of governors in December 2015 and again in June 2016 following the assessment of the pilot classes. The board gave its approval and the teachers of all grades were equipped with a laptop and tablet as well as being given training sessions. Conferences were organised for families to raise awareness of and inform them about the project. One of them, in June 2017, led by Emmanuel Davidenkoff, author of "Le tsunami numérique", convinced many parents. From  September 2017, all pupils from CP to Terminale received a tablet for educational activities based on a tailored approach to learning, differentiated instruction, creativity, critical thinking, co-operation between pupils, communication and digital citizenship. At the nursery and infants school, each teacher uses 6 tablets per class for pupils in years 1 and 2. 

Continued teaching during the lockdown period from March to May 2020 was made possible through the allocation of a tablet per pupil and the implementation of the CALM procedure (Classe À La Maison). Each pupil, equipped with an already familiar tablet  was able to follow the lessons immediately after the unexpected lockdown in March 2020. 

This choice of equipment was renewed at the start of the 2021-22 school year with the implementation of phase 2 of the project and the allocation of the latest generation tablet.

References

External links
 Lycée Français Marie Curie de Zurich
 https://www.duebendorf.ch/_docn/1269895/20140513-BE-Das_Neubauprojekt_des_LFZ.pdf

Zurich
1955 establishments in Switzerland
Educational institutions established in 1955
Upper secondary schools in the Canton of Zürich
Education in Zürich
Dübendorf